These are the Official Charts Company UK Dance Singles Chart number one hits of 1994. The archive on the Official Charts Company website lists the top 40 dance singles from 3 July 1994, the beginning of the first charting week. The dates listed in the menus below represent the Saturday after the Sunday the chart was announced, as per the way the dates are given in chart publications such as the ones produced by Billboard.

See also
1994 in music

References

1994 record charts
1994 in British music
1994